Ghuzeh Zan (also Romanized as Ghūzeh Zan and Qūzeh Zan; also known as Geyūeh Jān) is a village in Bam Rural District, Bam and Safiabad District, Esfarayen County, North Khorasan Province, Iran. At the 2006 census, its population was 209, in 47 families.

References 

Populated places in Esfarayen County